Potomac may refer to:

Places in the United States
Washington, D.C. area:
The Potomac River, which flows through West Virginia, Maryland, Virginia, and Washington, D.C.
The Potomac Highlands, a region of the Potomac River's watershed in West Virginia
Patowmack Canal, also spelled Potomac, a series of five inoperative canals in Maryland and Virginia
Potomac, Maryland, an unincorporated area in Montgomery County
Potomac Airfield, a general aviation airport in Fort Washington, Maryland
Potomac Park, Maryland, in Allegany County
Potomac, Virginia, an extinct town formerly located in Arlington County

Other places in the U.S.:
Potomac, Illinois, a village in Vermilion County
Potomac, Montana, an unincorporated community in Missoula County
Potomac, West Virginia, an unincorporated community

Companies
 Potomac Company, a former infrastructure company
 Epic Games, originally called Potomac Computer Systems, and American video game and software developer

Transportation

Trains
 Potomac, a series of several former Amtrak passenger trains:
Potomac (Amtrak train)
Potomac Special
Potomac Turbo

Vessels
USS Potomac, one of six ships
Potomac (tug), a Patapsco Class tug built for Vane Brothers Company

Other uses
Patawomeck (or Potomac), a Native American tribe for whom the Potomac River was named
Army of the Potomac, a major Union army during the American Civil War
1345 Potomac, an asteroid
Potomac Horse Fever, a disease in horses
Potomac Lake, an artificial lake in Gunnersbury Park, London commissioned by Lionel Nathan Rothschild.
University of the Potomac, a degree-granting college based in Washington, D.C.